Mulegé is the northernmost municipality of the Mexican state of Baja California Sur. It is the largest municipality by area in the state and in Mexico (a new municipality was created out of Ensenada, the former largest), with an area of 33,092.20 km2 (12,777 sq mi). In the 2020 Census, it had a population of 64,022 inhabitants. Isla Natividad is part of the municipality.

The municipal seat is located in Santa Rosalía. The El Vizcaíno Biosphere Reserve is located in the municipality, between the Pacific Ocean and the Gulf of California. With a landmass of over 24,930 km2 (9,625 sq mi), it is the largest wildlife refuge in Mexico and borders on the northern edge of the Valle de los Cirios Protected Area of Flora and Fauna.

History

Juan Rodríguez Cabrillo was the first explorer to navigate the coastline of Mulegé, whereas Sebastián Vizcaíno explored the inlands in 1596 on behalf of Gaspar de Zúñiga, viceroy of New Spain.

The first Spanish missionary to visit the area was Father Juan María de Salvatierra in 1705. Three years later, the Jesuit missionary Juan de Basaldúa founded the Santa Rosalía de Mulegé mission in the area locally known as Caaman Cagaleja, which means "river between two rocks." Other important Jesuit missions in Mulegé were San Ignacio and Guadalupe. In 1768, the Franciscans took over responsibility for colonial Baja California from the Jesuits.

Rich copper deposits were discovered in 1868, later developed as mines. In 1872, Eiseman y Valle was incorporated as a business for the exploitation of copper. In 1885, the French mining company El Boleo began its operations and built the town of Santa Rosalía; the first copper smelting furnace was installed in 1886.

The municipality was first incorporated in 1916 as part of the Baja California Territory, Southern District. In 1929, the municipal council was replaced by a municipal delegation. By 1954, the mining company "El Boleo" ceased operations, which resulted in many people moving to other parts of the country, but three years later, Fomento Minero decided to take over the company and restarted the copper exploitation work. Guerrero Negro was founded in 1957 on the Pacific Coast to supply the demand of salt in the western United States. When Baja California Sur became a state in 1972, the municipality of Mulegé was formally established.

There is an initiative to split the municipality into two, with the division along the ridge dividing the current municipality. The Pacific side, with Guerrero Negro and Villa Alberto Andrés Alvarado Arámburo would be separated from the Gulf of California side, which includes Santa Rosalía and Mulegé.

As of March 1, 2021, the municipality reported 1,188 recoveries, 46 active cases, and 109 deaths from the COVID-19 pandemic in Mexico.

Subdivisions
Including the municipal seat of Santa Rosalía, the municipality is subdivided into six delegaciones:

Santa Rosalía
Bahía Tortugas
Guerrero Negro
Mulegé
San Ignacio
Vizcaíno

Demographics and Transportation

The municipality has 979 localities, the largest of which (with 2020 populations in parentheses) were: Santa Rosalía (14,357), Guerrero Negro (13,596), Villa Alberto Andrés Alvarado Arámburo (10,897), Mulegé (3,834), Bahía Tortugas (2,367), classified as urban; and San Francisco (1,919), Bahía Asunción (1,453), Las Margaritas (1,145), and Estero de la Bocana (1,013), classified as rural.

Mulegé is crossed by the Carretera Transpeninsular (Mexican Federal Highway 1), which runs from Tijuana to Cabo San Lucas. Regional flights are available at the Palo Verde Airport in Santa Rosalía.

References

External links

 
Municipalities of Baja California Sur